Fashionably Late may refer to:

 Fashionably Late (Falling in Reverse album), 2013
Fashionably Late (song)
 Fashionably Late (The Slickee Boys album), 1988
 Fashionably Late (Honor Society album), 2009
 FASH-ionably Late, a 2014 collaboration EP by Fashawn and The Alchemist

See also
Fashionably Late with Stacy London, a late-night talk and variety show hosted by Stacy London
Fashionably Late with Rachel Zoe, an American fashion-themed talk show hosted by Rachel Zoe